Grapevine is an unincorporated community in Kern County, California, at the southern end of the San Joaquin Valley. The small village is directly adjacent to Interstate 5 and consists mainly of travelers' and roadside services.

Etymology
The village and grade are named for the canyon the trail passed through, after the wild grapes that grow along the original road. Its Spanish name is La Cañada de las Uvas, that is, Grapevine Ravine.

Geography
The ZIP Code is 93243, and the community is inside area code 661. A post office operated at Grapevine from 1923 to 1960.  The community of Wheeler Ridge lies three miles north of Grapevine on Interstate 5, with Lebec nine miles south.

Before the road was straightened and widened during 1933–34 by the three-lane Ridge Route Alternate (US 99), the Grapevine was infamous for its high accident rate. There are escape ramps branching off both sides of the downward part of the road for heavy trucks whose brakes fail on this five mile long, 6% grade, 1600-foot ascent -  and now straight - grade.

The Grapevine is subject to severe weather and closure to traffic in winter. The stretch of I-5 through the Grapevine and the Tejon Pass is sometimes closed by the California Highway Patrol, generally because of the icy conditions combined with the steep grade of the pass, and the high volume of traffic during the winter holidays. Occasionally, heavy rains will cause mud and rockslides, closing the freeway.  The Highway Patrol is also concerned, especially with the large number of big-rigs that pass through, that just  one accident in the icy or snowy conditions might force traffic to slow down or come to a complete stop, leaving hundreds of vehicles stalled at once.  Whenever there is such a closure, traffic must either wait for it to reopen, or endure a slow multi-hour detour.

Landmark
The top of the Grapevine is registered as California Historical Landmark #283, where Don Pedro Fages passed through in 1772 during his explorations through California.

Future development

The Tejon Ranch Company is planning further development in the area, which it identified as at "the northern base of the Interstate 5 grapevine, starting at the foothills in the southernmost portion of the San Joaquin Valley, extending parallel to the Tejon Ranch Commerce Center along I-5". A company spokesman said the development would result in 12,000 to 14,000 homes and 5.1 million square feet of commercial development. In addition, the company has identified seven thousand additional acres for a development to be called Grapevine North.

See also 
 Ridge Route, the former route currently bypassed by Interstate 5
 California Historical Landmarks in Kern County
California Historical Landmark

References

External links
 The Mountain Enterprise - local newspaper serving readers of Grapevine and some other small communities.

Additional reading
 Paul Duginski, "The Grapevine Is the Heart of California's Freeway System; It's Also Vulnerable," Los Angeles Times, December 28, 2019

Unincorporated communities in Kern County, California
San Joaquin Valley
Tehachapi Mountains
Mountain Communities of the Tejon Pass
Unincorporated communities in California